Georges Pixius (15 January 1901 – 5 June 1962) was a Luxembourgian boxer. He competed in the men's middleweight event at the 1928 Summer Olympics. In his first fight, he lost to Jan Heřmánek of Czechoslovakia.

References

1901 births
1962 deaths
Luxembourgian male boxers
Olympic boxers of Luxembourg
Boxers at the 1928 Summer Olympics
People from Rumelange
Middleweight boxers